Oduoha-Emuoha is one of the eight villages that make up Emohua Town of Emohua Local Government Area in Rivers State, Nigeria.

Name

Emohua Town is the headquarters of Emohua Local Government Area. Emohua Town itself consists of eight villages which. All the eight villages follow the same naming patterns of adding the suffix -Emohua

Families
The Village is also divided into two groups referred to as families. They are: Alimini and Ogbodo. These family names are historical.
Both Families are further divided into other sub families which produce the ruling council of the village.

Rulership
Rulership in Oduoha is just the same with every Ikwerre villages. But then each of the sub-families grouped under the two main families produces a representative (usually the oldest in the family) as a member of the Ruling Council of the village usually headed by the paramount ruler who assumes title of His Royal Highness

Populated places in Rivers State